Tully is a 2000 American drama film written and directed by Hilary Birmingham, starring Glenn Fitzgerald, Anson Mount, Bob Burrus and Julianne Nicholson. The film was screened at the Los Angeles Independent Film Festival on April 14, 2000, and received a limited release in the United States on November 1, 2002. It is based on an O. Henry Award-winning short story by author Tom McNeal.

Originally titled The Truth About Tully, the film changed its name to avoid confusion with Jonathan Demme's The Truth About Charlie.

Plot 
The story centers on the Coates brothers, Tully and Earl, who live on their father's ranch in rural Nebraska. Their mother abandoned the family when the boys were young. Tully is very outgoing and has relationships with many women, including a stripper named April. Earl is more of an introvert.

Ella, a childhood friend of both Coates brothers, comes back to town to start a veterinary practice. Ella appears to have more in common with Earl, as she is reserved and not the typical woman that Tully dates. Yet, they start a relationship.

The elder Coates, Tully Sr., clearly misses his wife and as the film develops, his financial problems worsen. It is eventually shown that his financial problems are due to his wife's medical bills (he never got a divorce). Tully Sr. dies ambiguously. The film's climax shows how the brothers and Ella react to this tragic event.

Cast

Critical reception 
The film develops with a very slow pace, and The New York Times critic Stephen Holden praises this in his review:

As deliberately paced as a late-afternoon amble around a homestead, the movie occasionally stops in its tracks to take a deep breath and soak in more of the rural atmosphere. Although this tendency to dawdle may frustrate viewers accustomed to a barrage of visual stimulation, the movie's unhurried rhythm eventually works a quiet spell, and after a while you find yourself settling back, adjusting to the film's bucolic metabolism and appreciating its eye and ear for detail.

Holden also compliments the acting, particularly that of Nicholson, whom he describes as "luminous in an utterly natural way". Kenneth Turan of the Los Angeles Times also commends the film's pace, stating that the "deliberate speed goes hand in hand with its unmistakable sense of place, its attraction to the rhythms of farm life and the unhurried sensibility of its small-town Nebraska setting".

Lisa Schwarzbaum of Entertainment Weekly gave the film a B+ rating, and writes, "the believable young people growing on this plot of soil are never predictable; neither are the unmannered, affecting performances".

Tully has an approval rating of 81% on Rotten Tomatoes based on 52 reviews.

Awards and nominations

References

External links 
  (archived)
 
 
 
 
 

2000 drama films
2000 films
American drama films
Films scored by Marcelo Zarvos
Films set in Nebraska
Films shot in Nebraska
American independent films
2000 independent films
2000s English-language films
2000s American films